Laura Pinski (born 30 August 1996 in Düsseldorf) is a German singer.

Career
Pinski was born in Düsseldorf; at the age of nine, she was diagnosed with skeleton-cancer. During that time she also discovered her interest for singing.  She currently is studying law.

In 2012 Pinski placed fifth in the talent show Das Supertalent with 8,30% in the final. In 2016 she participated in the German national final for the Eurovision Song Contest 2016 She missed out of a place in the top 3 after placing 4th in first round she gained 11.11% of the Public Vote.

References

External links 

Living people
German women pop singers
1996 births
Musicians from Düsseldorf
21st-century German women singers